Gregory Merle Davidson (born April 24, 1958) is a former American football center who played in the National Football League for three seasons. He played college football at North Texas and was signed by the Houston Oilers as an undrafted free agent in 1980.

Professional career

Houston Oilers
Davidson signed with the Houston Oilers as an undrafted free agent following the 1980 NFL Draft. He played in 39 games for Houston over the next three seasons, serving as the backup center and long snapper. He was released before the 1983 season.

San Antonio Gunslingers/Michigan Panthers
In 1984, Davidson was signed by the San Antonio Gunslingers and quickly traded to the Michigan Panthers. Davidson did not play for either team.

Houston Gamblers
Davidson was signed by the Houston Gamblers on April 26, 1984. He played six games for the Gamblers in the 1984 season.

Personal life
Davidson has four sons, including Beau and Christian Davidson, who both played college football. Beau played long snapper and tight end at Syracuse and North Texas from 2003 to 2007. He currently serves as the director of player personnel at University of Connecticut. Christian played long snapper at North Texas from 2005 to 2009, and currently coaches at Azle High School in Azle, Texas.

References

External links
 Pro Football Archives bio

1958 births
Living people
Sportspeople from Iowa
Players of American football from Iowa
Sportspeople from Texas
Players of American football from Texas
American football centers
North Texas Mean Green football players
Houston Oilers players
Houston Gamblers players
People from Independence, Iowa